The Men's 500 metres race of the 2015 World Single Distance Speed Skating Championships was held on 15 February 2015.

Results
The first run was started at 13:15 and the second run at 15:01.

References

Men's 500 metres